Hunny Hill is a suburb of the town of Newport, Isle of Wight, located in the north west of the town. The south of the suburb is located on the Lukely Brook which leads into the River Medina. To the east is the A3020 road.

The Isle Of Wight College is located opposite the suburb.

References 

Newport, Isle of Wight